Scythris scopolella is a species of moth of the family Scythrididae. It is found from the Iberian Peninsula, north to Belgium, east to Poland, the Czech Republic, Austria, and Italy. It is also found in Bulgaria and on Crete.

Adults are on wing from May to the end of June. They are active during daytime.

The larvae feed on Tortula muralis, Helianthemum, Hypericum, Sedum, and mosses growing on walls.

External links
Fauna Europaea
Lepidoptera of Belgium 

scopolella
Moths of Europe